Religion in national symbols can often be found in national anthems or flags. This has led to controversy in some secular states in regard to the separation of church and state, when the national symbol is officially sanctioned by a government.

Flags which incorporate symbols of religion

Buddhism and Hinduism

Christianity

Islam

Judaism

Traditional

National anthems which incorporate religion

Former national anthems

Coat of arms which symbolize religion

Buddhism and Hinduism

Christianity

Former

Islam

Former

Judaism

Traditional

Former

See also
 Religious symbolism
 French law on secularity and conspicuous religious symbols in schools
 Religious symbolism in the United States military
 United States Department of Veterans Affairs emblems for headstones and markers

Notes

References

Religion and politics
National symbols